HMY Royal George was a Royal Yacht of the Royal Navy of the United Kingdom, launched 1817, and last used in 1842. She became an accommodation hulk in 1902, and was broken up in 1905. Gilded dolphins and rope ornament from the yacht were reused as decoration in the principal bedroom of Adelaide Cottage in Home Park Windsor.

References

External links
 

Royal Yachts of the United Kingdom